New Jersey's 10th Legislative District is one of 40 in the state, covering the Ocean County municipalities of Bay Head Borough, Brick Township, Island Heights Borough, Lakehurst Borough, Lavallette Borough, Manchester Township, Mantoloking Borough, Point Pleasant Beach Borough, Seaside Heights Borough and Toms River Township as of the 2011 apportionment.

Demographic characteristics
As of the 2020 United States census, the district had a population of 228,713, of whom 190,141 (83.1%) were of voting age. The racial makeup of the district was 187,759 (82.1%) White, 8,128 (3.6%) African American, 929 (0.4%) Native American, 6,436 (2.8%) Asian, 36 (0.0%) Pacific Islander, 8,690 (3.8%) from some other race, and 16,735 (7.3%) from two or more races. Hispanic or Latino of any race were 25,017 (10.9%) of the population.

The district had 181,208 registered voters as of December 1, 2021, of whom 69,932 (38.6%) were registered as unaffiliated, 65,241 (36.0%) were registered as Republicans, 43,457 (24.0%) were registered as Democrats, and 2,578 (1.4%) were registered to other parties.

Political representation
For the 2022–2023 session, the district is represented in the State Senate by James W. Holzapfel (R, Toms River) and in the General Assembly by John Catalano (R, Brick Township) and Gregory P. McGuckin (R, Toms River).

The legislative district is entirely within New Jersey's 4th congressional district.

1965–1973
Following the 1964 Supreme Court decision in Reynolds v. Sims, legislative districts were required to be made as equal as possible with regards to total population. In the State Senate elections held in 1965, the 10th District consisted of Morris, Sussex, and Warren counties. For the remainder of the terms from the 1967 elections until the 1973 elections, it consisted of only Morris County with the district split into two Assembly districts (10A and 10B).

Two Senators were elected from this district in each of the regular Senate elections held. Republicans Thomas J. Hillery and Milton Woolfenden, Jr. were elected in 1965. Harry L. Sears and Joseph J. Maraziti (both Republican) won the 1967 election for a four-year term. Republicans Maraziti and Peter W. Thomas won the 1971 election, though both would not complete their term; Maraziti was elected to Congress in 1972 and resigned shortly before taking office in January 1973 and Thomas would resign on November 29, 1973 to become a Superior Court judge. Democrat Stephen B. Wiley would win the remainder of Maraziti's term in a 1973 special election.

For the 1967 and 1969 elections, Assembly District 10A was located in the southern portion of Morris County, stretching from Chester Township to Parsippany, and Assembly District 10B making up the remainder of the county. In the 1971 election, District 10B ran through the east-central portion of the county running from Morris Township northeast to Butler with a spur to Randolph Township and Dover. District 10A consisted of the "C" that was formed in the county. In all instances, two members from each district were sent to the Assembly in each election.

The members elected to the Assembly from each district are as follows:

District composition since 1973
When the 40 equal-population map was created in 1973, the 10th District ran along the beach towns of Monmouth County from Monmouth Beach to Brielle; it also included the large suburb of Wall Township and two Ocean County boroughs, Point Pleasant and Point Pleasant Beach. In the 1981 redistricting, the 10th was shifted south, only keeping Point Pleasant and Point Pleasant Beach. The 10th included the large suburbs of Lakewood Township, Brick Township, and Dover Township (now Toms River Township). As a result of shifting population towards the suburban Ocean County townships, the 1991 redistricting eliminated Lakewood and Point Pleasant from the 10th District. The 2001 redistricting brought little change to the 10th, only adding South Toms River, Seaside Park, Point Pleasant, and Monmouth County's Manasquan.

Election history

Election results, 1973–present

Senate

General Assembly

Election results, 1965–1973

Senate

General Assembly

District 10A

District 10B

References

Ocean County, New Jersey
10